Laurence Henry Woolmer (1906 – 1977) was the Bishop of Lahore from 1949 until 1968. Educated at King Edward's School, Birmingham, and St Peter's College, Oxford he was a banker before being ordained in 1938.  After a curacy at St Paul's, Salisbury, he became a Missionary in  India, eventually rising to be Archdeacon of Lahore before elevation to the episcopate. After 19 years he returned to be  Vicar of Meonstoke with Corhampton and  Exton.  His Times obituary described him as  "a man of prayer whose boundless energy and zeal showed the spirit of Christ in all his dealings.”

Notes

1906 births
1971 deaths
People educated at King Edward's School, Birmingham
Alumni of St Peter's College, Oxford
20th-century Anglican bishops in Asia
English Anglican missionaries
Anglican missionaries in India
Anglican missionaries in Pakistan
Archdeacons of Lahore
Anglican bishops of Lahore
English expatriates in Pakistan
People from Birmingham, West Midlands